Uday Mudliyar (died 25 May 2013) was an Indian politician. He was the MLA for Rajnandgaon from 1993 to 1998 and from 2003 to 2008.

Death
On 25 May 2013, he was shot by naxalites in an attack.

References

2013 deaths
Year of birth missing
Chhattisgarh MLAs 2003–2008
Assassinated Indian politicians
People murdered in Chhattisgarh
Indian murder victims
Terrorism victims in India
Deaths by firearm in India
People from Rajnandgaon
Indian National Congress politicians
Madhya Pradesh MLAs 1993–1998